Hotonj is a village in Vogošća municipality, near Sarajevo, Federation of Bosnia and Herzegovina, Bosnia and Herzegovina.

History
During the 1992-1995 war, it was the front line between Serb forces and Bosnian Army, so it suffered destruction mainly from Light weapons. After the war it became integral part of Federation, so most of Serbs moved out, and housing has been bought by Bosniaks. Additionally, it has undergone intensive construction (Mosque, sport fields, oil pumps, renewed and widened asphalt roads, etc.) since about 2000, because of its very appealing position between Sarajevo and Vogošća.

Demographics 
According to the 2013 census, its population was 4580.

References

Populated places in Vogošća